Graziano Origa is an Italian artist. In 1979, he founded the magazine Punk Artist.

In 1972, Graziano began to work in comics at StudiOriga in Milan. 

He draws black and white pen/ink portraits: Presley, Divine, Krisma, Eva Robin's, Armani, Fiorucci, Cadinot, Sid Vicious, Pasolini, Warhol. 

From 1977 to 1979 he directed the monthly magazine of underground music Gong.

In the 1980s he lives in New York City, making illustrations for the Italian daily newspaper Progresso Italoamericano. Also for the chic-gay monthly Advocate, Torso, Blueboy and the weekly Screw. Origa in Milan became friends with the painter Fernando Carcupino, with him discuss a lot about erotica arts in the tavern "Risotteria".

With his partner photographer, Joe Zattere, founded fashion magazines such as Punk Artist (1979), Focus (1985), and Fumetti d'Italia (1992).

Books
 Enciclopedia del Fumetto, Ottaviano, due volumi, 1977 
 Diary of a Punk Artist, Iride, 1980 
 Origa Dessins, Ed. de la Mouette, Francia, 1991 
 I mondi di Dylan Dog, Unilito, 1992 
 Videomax, Scarabeo, 1994
 Monografia Corrado Roi, Borsa del Fumetto, 1994 
 L'Isola dei fumetti, con Bepi Vigna, Scarabeo, 1994 
 Magnus: Lo Sconosciuto, Edizioni ReM, 1999 
 Magnus: 110 pillole Storyboard, Edizioni ReM, 2000 
 Diavolo meridiano, con Giuseppe Pusceddu, Aipsa, 2001 
 Edifumetto Index, Edizioni ReM, 2002 
 Incredibili Comics!, Edizioni ReM, 2003 
 Vietato ai minori, Rizzoli, 2007

External links 
Graziano Origa Foundation
Graziano Origa Punk Artist
Fumetti d'Italia
Graziano Origa - Nova 100

Italian comics artists
Italian comics writers
Italian erotic artists
Living people
1952 births
People from Sardinia